Eric M. Genden, MD, MHCA, FACS is a United States head and neck cancer surgeon at the Icahn School of Medicine at Mount Sinai and Mount Sinai Health System in New York City.  where he serves as the Isidore Friesner Professor and Chairman of Otolaryngology–Head and Neck Surgery and Professor of Neurosurgery and Immunology. According to his biography at Mount Sinai, Genden's professional titles also include Senior Associate Dean for Clinical Affairs, He is Executive Vice President of Ambulatory Surgery, and Director of the Head and Neck Institute at the Mount Sinai Health System.

Education
Genden received his B.A. degree from Columbia University in 1987 and graduated from Mount Sinai School of Medicine in 1992 where he obtained his MD degree with Distinction in Research, and Harvard University School of Public Health with a Masters in Healthcare Management. His residency training at Washington University and Barnes-Jewish Hospital in St. Louis.

Career
Genden's expertise is in thyroid, parathyroid surgery, head and neck cancer surgery, and airway reconstruction. Memberships include the New York Head and Neck Society, American Head and Neck Society, American Board of Facial Plastic and Reconstructive Surgery, and the American Broncho-Esophagological Association.

In 2006, Genden performed the first jaw transplant using the patient's jaw and bone marrow.

Genden has authored six textbooks on oncology and microvascular head and neck reconstruction. He published more than 200 peer-reviewed articles and co-authored a chapter about facial transplantation in for Facial Plastic Surgery Clinics of North America. He served as a co-investigator on more than 15 clinical trials.

He graduated from Brooks School in 1983 and received the Distinguished Brooksian Recipient Award in 2018, and is a contributing editor at the Journal of the American Medical Association's JAMAevidence.

Research 
A partial list of Genden's research areas include the debate between hemithyroidectomy or total thyroidectomy for well-differentiated stage T2 tumors; he has studied as well as written about palliative care for patients with head and neck cancer; and the role of human papillomavirus status in recurrent and metastatic squamous cell carcinoma of the head and neck.

Publications

Books

Publications 

A rare prevertebral ordinary lipoma presenting as obstructive sleep apnea: computed tomographic and magnetic resonance imaging findings. Eloy JA, Carneiro E, Vibhute P, Genden EM, Bederson JB, Som PM. " Arch Otolaryngol Head Neck Surg 2008 Sep. 
Oral squamous cell carcinoma: histologic risk assessment, but not margin status, is strongly predictive of local diseasefree and overall survival. Brandwein-Gensler M, Teixeira MS, Lewis CM, Lee B, Rolnitzky L, Hille JJ, Genden E, Urken ML, Wang BY. Am J Surg Pathol 2005 
Treatment considerations for head and neck cancer in the elderly. Genden EM, Rinaldo A, Shaha AR, Clayman GL, Werner JA, Suarez C, Ferlito A. J Laryngol Otol, 2005 
Reepithelialized orthotopic tracheal allografts expand memory cytotoxic T lymphocytes but show no evidence of chronic rejection. Cleven HA, Genden EM, Moran TM. Transplantation, 2005 
Is there a role for selective neck dissection after chemoradiation for head and neck cancer? Robbins KT, Ferlito A, Suarez C, Brizel DM, Bradley PJ, Pellitteri PK, Clayman GL, Kowalski LP, Genden EM, Rinaldo A. J Am Coll Surg, 2004 
Pharyngocutaneous fistula following laryngectomy. Genden EM, Rinaldo A, Shaha AR, Bradley PJ, Rhys-Evans PH, Ferlito A. Acta Otolaryngol, 2004 
Primary sphenoid sinus esthesioneuroblastoma. Morris L, Govindaraj S, Genden EM. Am J Otolaryngol, 2004 
Complications of free flap transfers for head and neck reconstruction following cancer resection. Genden EM, Rinaldo A, Suarez C, Wei WI, Bradley PJ, Ferlito A. Oral Oncol, 2004 
Effect of fibrin matrix and vascular endothelial growth factor on reepithelialization of orthotopic murine tracheal transplants. Govindaraj S, Gordon R, Genden EM. Ann Otol Rhinol Laryngol, 2004 
Reconstruction of the hard palate with the radial forearm free flap: Outcomes and Quality of Life. Wallace D, Genden EM, Urken ML. Head and Neck, 2004 
Sensory topography of the oral cavity and the impact of free flap reconstruction: A preliminary study. Zur KB, Genden EM, Urken ML. Head and Neck, 2004 
Prediction of Postoperative Hypocalcemia after Thyroid Surgery using a Rapid Intraoperative Parathyroid Hormone Assay. Mandell DL, Genden EM, Mechanick JI, Bergman DA, Urken ML. Arch Otolaryngol Head Neck Surg, 2004

References

External links
 Mount Sinai Hospital homepage
Roger Ebert's View on Losing His Voice, ABC News
Girl's Windpipe Replacement Still Works 4 Years Later, Drugs.com

Living people
American medical academics
American otolaryngologists
Harvard School of Public Health alumni
Icahn School of Medicine at Mount Sinai faculty
Columbia College (New York) alumni
Icahn School of Medicine at Mount Sinai alumni
Year of birth missing (living people)